Afro Blue Band was an American jazz ensemble who released one album.

Personnel
 Arthur Barron
Steve Berrios (drums)
Lionel Cole
Glen Cronkhite
Jerry Gonzalez (trumpet)
Mark Levine   (piano)
Dave Liebman (saxophone)
Mel Martin
Melton Mustafa (trumpet)
Steve Neil
Phoenix Rivera
Hilton Ruiz (piano)
Papo Vasquez
Nicole Yarling

Discography
1995: Impressions (Milestone Records)

References

1990s establishments in the United States
1990s disestablishments in the United States
Milestone Records artists
American jazz ensembles
Musical groups established in the 1990s
Musical groups disestablished in the 1990s